Galih Sudaryono (born January 4, 1987) is an Indonesian professional footballer who plays as a goalkeeper.

Club career

Borneo
On December 23, 2014, he signed with Pusamania Borneo.

kalteng Putra
He was signed for Kalteng Putra to play in Liga 2 in the 2017 season.

Persis Solo
In 2018, Galih signed a contract with Indonesian Liga 2 club Persis Solo.

Sriwijaya
He was signed for Sriwijaya to play in Liga 2 in the 2019 season.

Persijap Jepara
In 2020, Galih signed a contract with Indonesian Liga 2 club Persijap Jepara.

References

External links
 Galih Sudaryono at Liga Indonesia
 Galih Sudaryono at Soccerway

1987 births
Living people
People from Semarang
Indonesian footballers
Liga 1 (Indonesia) players
Persiba Balikpapan players
Persija Jakarta players
Borneo F.C. players
Sriwijaya F.C. players
Association football goalkeepers
Footballers at the 2006 Asian Games
Asian Games competitors for Indonesia
Sportspeople from Central Java